Philip Jackson (birth unknown) is an English former professional rugby league footballer who played in the 1970s and 1980s.

Playing career

International honours
Phil Jackson won caps for England while at Bradford Northern in 1975 against Wales, and in the 1975 Rugby League World Cup against France.

Player's No.6 Trophy Final appearances
Phil Jackson played right-, i.e. number 10, in Bradford Northern's 3-2 victory over Widnes in the 1974–75 Player's No.6 Trophy Final during the 1974–75 season at Wilderspool Stadium, Warrington on Saturday 25 January 1975.

References

External links

Bradford Bulls players
England national rugby league team players
English rugby league players
Place of birth missing (living people)
Rugby league props
Rugby league second-rows
Living people
Year of birth missing (living people)